Emanuel Gabriel Björling (2 December 1808 – 3 November 1872) was a Swedish mathematician. He was the father of mathematician Carl Fabian Björling.

Career 

In 1836, he became the associate professor of mechanics at the University of Uppsala. He was a lecturer and later a rector at Västerås grammar school. He is most well known for the Björling problem.

In 1850, he became a member of the Royal Swedish Academy of Sciences.

References

External links 
 http://runeberg.org/sbh/bjorlieg.html
 http://genealogy.math.ndsu.nodak.edu/id.php?id=20542
 Author profile in the database zbMATH

1808 births
1872 deaths
Swedish mathematicians
Uppsala University alumni
Members of the Royal Swedish Academy of Sciences